The 2012 South African Figure Skating Championships were held at the Festival Mall in Kempton Park on 6-8 May 2012. Skaters competed in the disciplines of men's and ladies' singles.

Senior results

Men

Ladies

External links
 2012 South African Championships results

South African Figure Skating Championships, 2012
South African Figure Skating Championships
South African Figure Skating Championships, 2012